Zlatko Junuzović (born 26 September 1987) is an Austrian former professional footballer who played as a midfielder. From 2006 to 2017 he represented the Austria national football team. He was known as a free-kick specialist.

Early life
Junuzović moved with his parents to Austria when he was five years old. Before his 12th birthday, they went on to Graz, where he soon played for the youth teams of Grazer AK.

Club career
Aged 17, Junuzović made his debut for Grazer AK in the Bundesliga in spring 2005. In 2006, he was called up to play for the ÖFB-Team and became a regular starter for Grazer AK. In summer 2007, Junuzović moved to SK Austria Kärnten before joining FK Austria Wien in summer 2009.

In 2010, Junuzović was awarded two awards for his performances with Austria Wien and the national team: the managers of the Austrian Bundesliga voted him Austrian Footballer of the Year and the country's supporters voted him "Player of the Year" in the annual award awarded by the Kronen Zeitung.

In January 2012, Junuzović joined Bundesliga club SV Werder Bremen, signing a contract which lasteduntil 30 June 2015. In February 2015, it was announced that his contract had been extended until June 2018.

Having completed the 2014–15 season with six goals and 15 assists, third in the Bundesliga behind Kevin De Bruyne and Thomas Müller, Junuzović was voted as "Player of the Season" by Werder's fans.

On 18 March 2017, he scored his second goal of the 2016–17 season in a 3–0 win against Leipzig, a match that saw all three of Werder Bremen's Austrian players score in the club's highest win of the season.

In April 2018, Junuzović announced he would leave Werder Bremen after six and half years at the club. He wnt to FC Red Bull Salzburg in the Austrian Bundesliga. In 2022, he ended his career and became assistance coach of FC Liefering.

Personal life
Junuzović was born in the Serbian town of Loznica to a Bosnian family.

International career
Junuzović played for Austria at the 2007 FIFA U-20 World Cup where they claimed fourth place. He made his debut for the senior team in a March 2006 friendly match against Canada.

He represented the national team at the 2016 Euros.

In October 2017, after the conclusion of the qualifiers for the 2018 World Cup during which Austria failed to reach qualification, Junuzović announced his retirement from the national team.

Career statistics

Club

International goals

Scores and goals list Austria's goal tally first.

Honours

Club
'''Red Bull Salzburg
Austrian Football Bundesliga: 2018–19, 2019–20, 2020–21, 2021–22
Austrian Cup: 2018–19, 2019–20, 2020–21, 2021–22

Individual
Austrian Footballer of the Year: 2010
Werder Bremen Supporters' Player of the Season: 2014–15

References

External links

 
 Profile at UEFA.com
 Profile and Statistics at Guardian's Stats Centre

1987 births
Living people
Sportspeople from Loznica
Austrian footballers
Austria youth international footballers
Austria under-21 international footballers
Austria international footballers
Austrian people of Bosnia and Herzegovina descent
Austrian people of Serbian descent
Austrian expatriate footballers
Grazer AK players
FC Kärnten players
FK Austria Wien players
SV Werder Bremen players
FC Red Bull Salzburg players
Austrian Football Bundesliga players
Bundesliga players
Expatriate footballers in Germany
Naturalised citizens of Austria
UEFA Euro 2016 players
Association football midfielders
Bosniaks of Serbia
Yugoslav emigrants to Austria
Footballers from Carinthia (state)
Footballers from Graz
Austrian expatriate sportspeople in Germany